Zurek may refer to:

 Żurek, a kind of soup
Żurek (surname), a Polish surname
 Bartosz Żurek, born 1993, Polish footballer
 Wojciech H. Zurek, Polish-born American physicist
 Žůrek, a Czech surname
 Libor Žůrek, born 1979, Czech footballer
 Patrick Zurek, Bishop of Amarillo, American priest of Czech descent
 Teresita Román de Zurek, writer and chef

See also